IrAlCo may refer to:

 Iranian Aluminium Company
 Irish Aluminium Company, established in 1964 by Franz Pol in Collinstown North Westmeath